In basketball, a three-point field goal (also known as a "three-pointer" or "3-pointer") is a field goal made from beyond the three-point line, a designated arc radiating from the basket. A successful attempt is worth three points, in contrast to the two points awarded for shots made inside the three-point line.  The Liga ACB's (Endesa) three point field goal percentage leader is the player with the highest three point percentage in a given season.

To qualify as a leader for the three point field goal percentage, a player must play in at least 80 percent of the total number of possible games, and must make at least 50 three pointers the entire season.

Three Point Percentage leaders

Notes

References

Basketball in Spain
Liga ACB